The Panasonic Lumix DMC-FZ70 or Panasonic Lumix DMC-FZ72 is a DSLR-like ultrazoom bridge camera announced by Panasonic on July 18, 2013. It succeeds the Panasonic Lumix DMC-FZ62. FZ70 and FZ72 refer to the same camera model in different markets. The FZ70/72 has a 16 megapixel sensor and 20-1200mm equivalent, 60x optical zoom lens. Its successor is the FZ82 with a 18 megapixel sensor, 4K video and the same 60x optical zoom lens.

At the time of its release, the FZ70/72 had the largest advertised zoom range of available ultrazoom cameras, tying with the Canon PowerShot SX50 HS and Fujifilm FinePix SL1000 at the long end, and going to 20mm equivalent rather than the other cameras' 24mm in terms of wide angle.

Other features
Active POWER O.I.S. mode
Wind Shield Zoom microphone
Implements DPOF print order format

References
http://www.dpreview.com/products/panasonic/compacts/panasonic_dmcfz70/specifications

External links

Panasonic Lumix DMC-FZ72 review

Bridge digital cameras
FZ72